John Leonard Watson (born 1951) is an American chess International Master and author. In 2022, Watson was inducted into the U.S. Chess Hall of Fame along with GM James Tarjan and the late Daniel Willard Fiske. Watson is also a recipient of the US Chess Federation's Frank J. Marshall Award, and a 2015 inductee into the Colorado Chess Hall of Fame.

Watson was born in Milwaukee and grew up in Omaha, Nebraska, United States. He was educated at Brownell-Talbot, Harvard, and the University of California, San Diego, where he took his degree in engineering. He has won many chess tournaments including the first US National High School Chess Championship and the American Open. As an engineer at Hughes Aircraft, Watson co-developed and patented (with colleagues M.I. Parr and T. G. Vishwanath) the algorithm that permits mobile phones to function in valleys.

Watson is a renowned chess theorist and author, having published more than thirty books on many aspects of chess. His 1999 book Secrets of Modern Chess Strategy won the British Chess Federation's Book of the Year award as well as the United States Chess Federation Book of the Year. The successor volume Chess Strategy in Action was the Chesscafe Book of the Year. These two books explore and theorize how radically chess has changed since the early 20th century, and how old and supposedly 'time-tested' rules for the conduct of play have been replaced by broader and revolutionary practice . These books have been translated into several languages. In a lighter vein, Watson wrote the Chessman comic book series, illustrated by Chris Hendrickson and Svein Myreng. Chessman comics are now out-of-print collectors' items. Watson has a regular book review columns at The Week in Chess, the publication of the London Chess Centre (available online), and in Chess Life. His weekly Internet radio show 'Chess Talk with John Watson' was hosted by on Chess.FM, the radio arm of the Internet Chess Club (ICC). 

Watson is much in demand as a chess coach; his students have included Tal Shaked, the 1997 World Junior Champion, Senior Master Patrick Hummel, Abby Marshall, and other US scholastic champions.

Watson is married to drama scholar Maura Giles-Watson, who teaches at the University of San Diego; they live in San Diego, California.

Selected books
Play the French, third edition, (Cadogan Chess Books) 
The Unconventional King's Indian 
The Gambit Guide to the Modern Benoni 
Secrets of Modern Chess Strategy: Advances since Nimzowitsch, Gambit Publications, 1999, 
Chess Strategy in Action, Gambit, 2003, 
English 1...P-K4 
Dangerous Weapons: The French, Everyman Chess (2007): 
Mastering the Chess Openings, Gambit Publications (in four volumes) 
Volume 1 (1. e4):  (2006)
Volume 2 (1. d4):  (2007)
Volume 3 (1. c4):  (2009)
Volume 4:  (2010)

References

External links

Book Reviews by IM John Watson
Photograph on Colorado Chess Informant

1951 births
Living people
Harvard University alumni
University of California, San Diego alumni
American chess players
American non-fiction writers
American chess writers
American male non-fiction writers
Chess International Masters
Chess coaches